Predslava Rurikovna (?-1204+), princess of Volhynia, was the daughter of Grand Prince of Kiev Rurik Rostislavich and Anna of Turov.

She was married to the Prince of Volhynia Roman the Great in 1180-1198. In February 1204 Roman the Great forced a monastic tonsure on Rurik, his wife Anna and daughter Predslava.

Footnotes 

Year of birth unknown
1204 deaths
Kievan Rus' princesses
Rurikids
12th-century Rus' people